The Carbine Club Stakes is an Australian Turf Club Group 3 Thoroughbred horse race, for three year olds with set weights and penalties over a distance of 1,600 metres, held annually at Randwick Racecourse in Sydney, Australia in April on the Australian Derby racecard. Total prize money for the race is A$200,000.

History
The race is named in honour of Carbine, a champion in the 19th century, including Melbourne Cup winner and dual Sydney Cup winner who made also a prolific impact in breeding of thoroughbreds in Australia and England.

Grade
1986–2010 - Listed Race
2011 onwards - Group 3

Winners

 2022 - Straight Arron
 2021 - Kiku 
 2020 - Entente
 2019 - Ringerdingding
 2018 - Muraaqeb
 2017 - Acatour
 2016 - He's Our Rokkii
2015 - Hi World
2014 - Gypsy Diamond
2013 - Toydini
2012 - Fat Al
2011 - Needs Further
2010 - Al Dhafra 
2009 - Orca 
2008 - Road To Rock  
2007 - Yasumori  
2006 - Belmonte  
2005 - Magnetism  
2004 - Toulouse Lautrec 
2003 - Who Did It 
2002 - Wet Lips 
2001 - Spurred On 
2000 - Valuate  
1999 - Le Zagaletta 
1998 - Noise 
1997 - The North 
1996 - Mr. Piper 
1995 - Juggler 
1994 - Espinosa 
1993 - Golden Sword 
1992 - Conshana
1991 - New Acquaintance
1990 - Mink Jacket
1989 - Nanutarra
1988 - Rigoletto
1987 - Bigamy
1986 - Faris King
1985 - Double Dandy    
1984 - Bring Home      
1983 - Fairy God       
1982 - Noble Ambition  
1981 - Around The Traps

Notes:
  Date of race rescheduled due to postponement of the Easter Saturday meeting because of the heavy track conditions. The meeting was moved to Easter Monday, 6 April 2015.

See also
 Carbine Club Stakes (VRC)
 List of Australian Group races
 Group races

External links 
Carbine Club Stakes (ATC)

References

Horse races in Australia